Election science is a discipline within political science that seeks to apply quantitative tools from hard sciences to the study of elections. It is distinct from the study of public opinion in elections, which describes how elections affect voter opinion and election campaigns, by focusing on the ways that institutions and their administration affect public opinion rather than the other way around. 

The study of election science can be traced back to early scientific studies of electoral systems, like the development of the Condorcet method to analyze voting methods in the 18th century. The field came into being following the 2000 United States presidential election, where the administrative and technical failures affected the outcome of the election. Examples of subjects where election science methods are applied include gerrymandering, electoral fraud, and voter registration.  

There is an academic conference dedicated to the study of election science and the Southern Political Science Association has a sub-conference for the study of election science. In addition, multiple universities now offer a bachelor of science in political science for a data science track.

References 

 

Political science